Jean-Jacques Nattiez  (born December 30, 1945, in Amiens, France) is a musical semiologist or semiotician and professor of musicology at the Université de Montréal. He studied  semiology with Georges Mounin and Jean Molino and music semiology (doctoral) with Nicolas Ruwet.

He is a noted specialist on the writings of the composer and conductor Pierre Boulez.

In 1990, he was made a Member of the Order of Canada. In 2001, he was made a Knight of the National Order of Quebec.

Awards
1988, Dent Medal of the Royal Musical Association
1989, Prix André-Laurendeau pour les sciences humaines from the Association canadienne française pour l'avancement des sciences
1990, Molson Prize from the Canada Council
1994, prix Léon-Gérin pour les sciences sociales du Gouvernement du Québec
1996, Fumio Koizumi Prize for Ethnomusicology, Tokyo, Japan
2004, the Killam Prize by the Canada Council for the Arts
In 2011, he was promoted to Officer of the Order of Canada "for his contributions to the development of musicology as a researcher, professor and specialist of music semiotics".

Bibliography
Proust as Musician. Translated by Derrick Puffett. Cambridge, 1989.
Music and Discourse: Toward a Semiology of Music (Musicologie générale et sémiologue, 1987). Translated by Carolyn Abbate (1990). .
Wagner Androgyne; A Study in Interpretation. Translated by Stewart Spencer. Princeton University Press, 1993.  (pbk.).

References

1945 births
Living people
People from Amiens
French semioticians
Canadian musicologists
Fellows of the Royal Society of Canada
Knights of the National Order of Quebec
Officers of the Order of Canada
French male non-fiction writers